Dolenja Vas pri Polici is a small settlement north of Polica in the Municipality of Grosuplje in central Slovenia. The area is part of the historical region of Lower Carniola. The municipality is now included in the Central Slovenia Statistical Region.

Name
The name of the settlement was changed from Dolenja vas to Dolenja vas pri Polici in 1953. In the past the German name was Niederdorf.

Cultural heritage
A small roadside chapel-shrine south of the village dates to 1875.

References

External links

Dolenja Vas pri Polici on Geopedia

Populated places in the Municipality of Grosuplje